Eugénie Sandler P.I. is a 13-part Australian children's series that first aired on ABC1 in 2000. The series stars Xaris Miller as the title character.

Overview 
Eugénie Sandler is your average everyday teenager, worried about the usual things, like her place in the world, who she is, and what it's like to be fifteen. She also worries about her father Ray, who is a private investigator whose job causes frequent changes of address. When her father goes missing one day and she discovers a bomb in her sink, her whole world is turned upside down. With the help of her new friend Warwick, she discovers that her world is not as simple as it seems and that the freedom of a (fictional) country known as Versovia depends on her actions. Along the way, she makes many new friends, saves a lot of lives and discovers that love is not as scary as people think.

Cast 
Xaris Miller as Eugénie Sandler
Matthew Vennell as Warwick Bedford
Brett Climo as Ray Sandler
Martin Jacobs as Detective Matt Gurny
Odette Joannides as Detective Teresa Brady
Saskia Post as Angela Duvier
Alex Meglett as Davorin
Jasper Bagg as Slavomir

Production 
In late 1999 the Australian Broadcasting Company came up with the idea of a new children's detective show. In early 2000 after many scripts were written and casting had completed, they started filming. The first episode of the 13-part series aired on 30 October 2000.

Episodes

Awards

AFI Awards

References 

2000 Australian television series debuts
2000 Australian television series endings
Australian children's television series
Television series about teenagers
Television shows set in Melbourne
Fictional Australian detectives
Fictional amateur detectives